Buk  is a village in the administrative district of Gmina Dobra, within Police County, West Pomeranian Voivodeship, in north-western Poland, on the border with Germany.

Before 1945 the area was part of the German Reich. For the history of the region, see History of Pomerania.

The village has a population of 250.

References

Villages in Police County
Germany–Poland border crossings